David Choinière (born February 7, 1997) is a Canadian soccer player who plays for Canadian Premier League side Forge FC.

Early life
Choinière began playing soccer at age five with Celtix du Haut-Richelieu. In 2011, he joined the Montreal Impact Academy. In 2016, he won the Federation de Soccer du Quebec (FSQ) Male Senior Player of Excellence award.

Club career

In January 2016, he joined FC Montreal, the second team of the Montreal Impact, in the USL. He made his professional debut on April 10, 2016 in a 2–1 defeat to Toronto FC II. A month later, he scored his professional goal against Bethlehem Steel FC on May 15.

On June 8, 2016, he made his debut for the Montreal Impact in a 2016 Canadian Championship match against Toronto FC. On June 28, 2016, he officially signed a professional contract with the Impact. He became the first player to sign a first team contract, after having played for the second team. In October 2016, Choinière made his MLS debut against the New England Revolution. In January 2017, he suffered an ankle injury, which caused him to miss the beginning of the season, returning in April. He scored his first goal for the Impact on May 30, 2017 in a Canadian Championship semi-final match. After making one appearance in the 2018 season, he would miss 6 months after having surgery on his ankle in April 2018, after having only played three game the previous season due to the same injury. After the 2018 season, Choinière declined a one-year contract extension and departed the club.

In March 2019, he joined Forge FC in the Canadian Premier League. Choinière scored his first goal for Forge on August 1, 2019, a late winner to make the score 2–1 at home in the preliminary round of the 2019 CONCACAF League against Guatemalan club Antigua GFC, which made Forge the first CPL club to ever win a match in a CONCACAF competition. He helped Forge win the CPL title in 2019, scoring the only goal in the second leg on November 2, 2019 against Cavalry FC. In February 2021, he signed an extension with the club. He was named CPL Player of the Month for October 2022. In 2022, he won his third CPL title with the club, scoring the second goal in a 2-0 victory in the championship match. In January 2023, Choinière signed a new multi-year deal to remain with Forge.

International career
He made his debut in the Canadian youth program in 2012 with the Canada U15 team at the Copa de México de Naciones.

In 2014, he played for the Canada U18 team at the 2014 Tournoi de Limoges. From 2015 until 2017 he attended several Canada U20 preparation camps, but ultimately missed the 2017 CONCACAF U-20 Championship due to injury. He was named to the Canada U23 preliminary squad for the 2020 CONCACAF Men's Olympic Qualifying Championship.

In September 2017, Choinière received his first Canadian senior team call-up for a friendly against Jamaica, but did not feature in the match.

Personal life
Choinière's younger brother Mathieu is also a soccer player. They faced each other for the first time in a 2022 Canadian Championship match between Forge and CF Montreal.

Honours

Club
Forge FC
Canadian Premier League: 2019, 2020, 2022

Career statistics

References

External links
 

1997 births
Living people
Association football midfielders
Canadian soccer players
Soccer people from Quebec
People from Saint-Jean-sur-Richelieu
FC Montreal players
CF Montréal players
Forge FC players
USL Championship players
Major League Soccer players
Canadian Premier League players
Canada men's youth international soccer players
Homegrown Players (MLS)
Celtix du Haut-Richelieu players